Hředle may refer to:

Hředle (Beroun District), a village and municipality in Beroun District in the Central Bohemian Region of the Czech Republic
Hředle (Rakovník District) a village and municipality in Rakovník District in the Central Bohemian Region of the Czech Republic